The Montana Ghost Town Preservation Society, founded in 1969 by then-professor of architectural history at Montana State University John N. Dehaas Jr., is a non-profit organization dedicated to educating the public to the benefits of preserving historic buildings, sites, and artifacts that make up the living history of Montana.

References

External links
 

1969 establishments in Montana
Organizations established in 1969
Cultural heritage organizations
Non-profit organizations based in Montana
History of Montana
 
Geography of Montana